Nothweiler is a municipality in Südwestpfalz district, in Rhineland-Palatinate, western Germany. The mayor is Nicole Grüny. As of December 2020 the population was 132. It is situated 268 metres above sea level and has an area of 3.68 km2 (1.42 sq mi).

References

Municipalities in Rhineland-Palatinate
Palatinate Forest
South Palatinate
Südwestpfalz